Uriel Pérez Jaurena (born February 28, 1976 in Montevideo, Uruguay) is a former Uruguayan footballer who has played for clubs in Uruguay, Argentina, Chile, Mexico, Bolivia and Colombia.

Teams
  Huracán Buceo 1993-1994
  Montevideo Wanderers 1995
  Huracán Buceo 1996
  Deportes Antofagasta 1997
  Huracán Buceo 1997-1998
  Mérida 1998
  Cruz Azul 1999
  Huracán Buceo 1999-2000
  Colon FC 2001-2002
  Belgrano de Córdoba 2002-2003
  San Martín de San Juan 2003-2004
  Nueva Chicago 2004-2005
  San Martín de San Juan 2005
  Oriente Petrolero 2006
  Almagro 2006
  Platense 2007
  Defensores de Belgrano de Villa Ramallo 2007-2009

References
 Profile at BDFA 
 
 
 Profile at Tenfield Digital 

1976 births
Living people
Uruguayan footballers
Uruguayan expatriate footballers
Montevideo Wanderers F.C. players
Huracán Buceo players
Cruz Azul footballers
CP Mérida footballers
Oriente Petrolero players
Nueva Chicago footballers
Club Almagro players
Club Atlético Belgrano footballers
San Martín de San Juan footballers
Club Atlético Platense footballers
C.D. Antofagasta footballers
Expatriate footballers in Chile
Expatriate footballers in Argentina
Expatriate footballers in Mexico
Expatriate footballers in Bolivia
Expatriate footballers in Colombia

Association football forwards